Burrowsia is a genus in the lichen family Caliciaceae. It is monospecific, containing the single crustose lichen Burrowsia cataractae. Both the species and the genus were described as new to science in 2020 by Alan Fryday and Ian Medeiros. Burrowsia cataractae is known from only a single location in Mpumalanga, South Africa.

The genus is characterised by the presence of pigmented, somewhat muriform (i.e., arranged like the partitions of a brick wall) ascospores, and asci with apical tube structures. The genus name honours John and Sandra Burrows, who manage the Buffelskloof Nature Reserve, where the type specimen was collected. The base of the waterfall at the type locality where the specimen was found is reflected in the specific epithet cataractae (Latin: "of the waterfall"). The lichen is saxicolous, and grows on the perpetually moist upper surfaces of quartzite rocks situated around tide pools.

Another lichen with a similar morphology to Burrowsia cataractae is Rhizocarpon lavatum, which also occurs in similar damp habitats in the Northern Hemisphere and in New Zealand. This species, however, does not have pigmented ascospores and differs from B. cataractae in both structure and chemistry of the ascus.

References

Caliciales
Lichen genera
Caliciales genera
Taxa described in 2020